Google Ads (formerly Google AdWords) is an online advertising platform developed by Google, where advertisers bid to display brief advertisements, service offerings, product listings, or videos to web users. It can place ads both in the results of search engines like Google Search (the Google Search Network) and on non-search websites, mobile apps, and videos. Services are offered under a pay-per-click (PPC) pricing model.

Google Ads is the main source of revenue for Alphabet Inc, contributing US$168.6 billion in 2020.

History

Google launched AdWords in 2000. Initially, Google set up and managed advertisers' campaigns. Google soon introduced the AdWords self-service portal to accommodate small businesses and those who wanted to manage their own campaigns. In 2005, Google started a campaign management service known as 'Jumpstart'.

The AdWords system was initially implemented on top of the MySQL database engine. After the system had been launched, management decided to use Oracle instead but was eventually reverted to MySQL after the system became much slower. Eventually, Google developed a custom distributed Relational database management system (RDBMS) known as Google F1 specifically for the needs of the Ad business. The interface offers Spreadsheet Editing, Search Query Reports, and conversion metrics.

In 2008, Google launched the Google Online Marketing Challenge, an in-class academic exercise for tertiary students. Over 8,000 students from 47 countries participated in the challenge in 2008, over 10,000 students from 58 countries took part in 2009, about 12,000 students in 2010, and almost 15,000 students from 70 countries in 2011. The challenge runs annually, roughly from January to June.

In April 2013, Google announced plans to add enhanced campaigns for AdWords to aid with campaign management catered to multiple-device users. The enhanced campaigns aimed to include advanced reports about conversions.

In July 2016, Google unveiled "Showcase Shopping" ads. With this format, retailers can choose to have a series of images that appear in search results related to various search queries and keywords.

In October 2017, Google revised AdWords' daily budget caps, which were previously set at a maximum of 120% of preset daily budgets, to a maximum of 200%. This change was rolled out on the same day it was announced, prompting criticism from paid search professionals. However, Google later clarified that this change would affect only short-term campaigns of less than 30 days and that for campaigns running more than 30 days, overage charges would be refunded.

On June 27, 2018, Google announced a rebranding of Google AdWords as Google Ads as of July 24, 2018.

In 2018, Bloomberg News reported that Google had paid millions of dollars to Mastercard for its users' credit card data for advertising purposes. The deal had not been publicly announced.

Functionality 
Google Ads' system is based partly on cookies and partly on keywords determined by advertisers. Google uses these characteristics to place advertising copy on pages that they think might be relevant. Advertisers pay when users divert their browsing to click on the advertising copy. Adverts can be implemented locally, nationally, or internationally.

Google's text advertisements mimic what the average search result looks like on Google. Image ads can be one of the several different standardized sizes as designated by the Interactive Advertising Bureau (IAB). In May 2016, Google announced Expanded Text Ads, allowing 23% more text.

Besides the Google search engine, advertisers also have the option of enabling their ads to show on Google's partner network, members of which receive a portion of generated income.

In addition to external search engine marketing agencies and consultants, Google has its own in-house team of account managers.

Features
Advertisers manage ads on the Google Ads website or using Google Ads Editor, a downloadable program that allows users to make bulk changes to ads and edit ads offline.

The Keyword Planner provides data on Google searches and other resources to help plan advertising campaigns.
Google Ads Manager Accounts (previously "My Client Centre (MCC)") allows users to manage multiple accounts from one login and dashboard. This is most commonly used by Marketing and Advertising agencies who manage a large portfolio of client accounts.
The Reach Planner allows users to forecast the reach and extent of their video ads across YouTube and Google video partners. The tool allows users to choose their audience, then recommends a combination of video ads that help reach the user's objectives and see the reach of their ads.
In addition to location and language targeting, advertisers can specify Internet Protocol (IP) addresses to be excluded. Advertisers can exclude up to 500 IP address ranges per campaign.
Placement-targeted advertisements (formerly Site-Targeted Advertisements) places adverts based on keywords, domain names, topics, and demographic targeting preferences entered by the advertiser. If domain names are targeted, Google also provides a list of related sites for placement. Advertisers bid on a cost-per-impression (CPI/CPM) or cost-per-click (CPC) basis for site targeting.
Remarketing allows marketers to show advertisements to users that have previously visited their website and allows marketers to create different audience lists based on the behavior of website visitors. Remarketing Lists for Search (RLSA) via Google Analytics became available in Google Ads in early June 2015, allowing for the use of standard GA remarketing lists to plan traditional text search ads. Dynamic remarketing can show past visitors the specific products or services they viewed. While common, some users may find overly overt use intrusive.
Ad extensions allow advertisers to show extra information with their ads, such as a business address, phone number, links to a web page or app, prices, or sales and promotions. Google Ads may also display automated extensions such as consumer ratings when the system predicts they will improve performance.
The Performance Max type of campaign, is used to run a single campaign across multiple Google channels such as YouTube, Display, Search, Discover, Gmail, and Maps, instead of having to create one for each channel.

Restrictions on ad content
The "Family status" of an ad ("family safe", "non-family safe", or "adult") is set by a Google reviewer and indicates what “audiences the ad and website are appropriate for”. This affects when and where, including in which countries, an ad can appear.

As of December 2010, Google AdWords decreased restrictions on sales of hard alcohol. It now allows ads that promote the sale of hard alcohol and liquor. This is an extension of a policy change that was made in December 2008, which permitted ads that promote the branding of hard alcohol and liquor.

Some keywords, such as those related to hacking, are not allowed at all. From June 2007, Google banned AdWords adverts for student essay-writing services, a move which received positive feedback from universities. Google has a variety of specific keywords and categories that it prohibits that vary by type and by country. For example, use of keywords for alcohol related products are prohibited in Thailand and Turkey; keywords for gambling and casinos are prohibited in Poland; keywords for abortion services are prohibited in Russia and Ukraine; and keywords for adult related services or products are prohibited worldwide as of June 2014. In Early 2022, Google has paused all ad sales in Russia in response to the ongoing crisis in Ukraine.

In March 2020, at the beginning of the Coronavirus crisis, Google blocked all face masks keywords from being eligible for ad targeting as part of a policy to prevent companies from attempting to capitalize on the pandemic.

Cost
Every time a user conducts a search on Google, Google Ads runs an auction in real time to determine which search ads are displayed on the search results page as well as the ad's position. The cost of a Google Ads campaign therefore depends on a variety of factors, including the maximum amount an advertiser is willing to pay-per-click the keywords being bid on, and the quality score of the ad (based on its relevance and click frequency and ad extensions).

Although an advanced bidding strategy can be used to automatically reach a predefined cost-per-acquisition (CPA), this should not be confused with a fixed CPA pricing model.

Conversion tracking
In addition to tracking clicks, Google Ads provides advertisers an ability to track and report other conversions that happen after the click such as purchases, sign ups or calls.
Conversion tracking is implemented by sending an identifier to the advertiser's website as a URL parameter, which is then used by advertiser to send conversions to Google Ads, allowing Google Ads to trace conversion back to the original click for reporting. Google also allows advertisers to install a pixel on their website that sends conversions to the Adwords account. This allows advertisers to target their ads to drive conversions more effectively. For most traffic, Google sends a unique identifier for each click (in a gclid parameter), allowing to determine source of conversion precisely. To comply with tracking restrictions on Apple devices, anonymized identifiers that aren't associated with specific person are used (called wbraid and gbraid). Google Ads provides ability to report many of such anonymous conversions by using "modeled conversions" that combine additional customer details to deduce, which user to attribute the conversion to.

Google Ads introduced enhanced conversions to make conversion measurement more accurate.

Lawsuits 

Google Ads have been the subject of lawsuits relating to trademark law (Google, Inc. v. Am. Blind & Wallpaper Factory and Rescuecom Corp. v. Google Inc.), fraud (Goddard v. Google, Inc.), and click fraud.

Overture Services, Inc. sued Google for patent infringement in April 2002 in relation to the AdWords service. The suit was settled in 2004 after Yahoo! acquired Overture; Google agreed to issue 2.7 million shares of common stock to Yahoo! in exchange for a perpetual license under the patent.

In 2006, Google settled a click fraud lawsuit for US$90 million.

In May 2011, Google cancelled the AdWords advertisement purchased by a Dublin sex worker rights group named "Turn Off the Blue Light" (TOBL), claiming that it represented an "egregious violation" of company ad policy by "selling adult sexual services". However, TOBL is a nonprofit campaign for sex worker rights and is not advertising or selling adult sexual services. After TOBL members held a protest outside Google's European headquarters in Dublin and sent in written complaints, Google reviewed the group's website. Google found the website content to be advocating a political position and restored the AdWords advertisement.

In June 2012, Google rejected the Australian Sex Party's ads for AdWords and sponsored search results for the July 12 by-election for the state seat of Melbourne, saying the Australian Sex Party breached its rules which prevent solicitation of donations by a website that did not display tax exempt status. Although the Australian Sex Party amended its website to display tax deductibility information, Google continued to ban the ads. The ads were reinstated on election eve after it was reported in the media that the Australian Sex Party was considering suing Google. On September 13, 2012, the Australian Sex Party lodged formal complaints against Google with the US Department of Justice and the Australian competition watchdog, accusing Google of "unlawful interference in the conduct of a state election in Victoria with corrupt intent" in violation of the Foreign Corrupt Practices Act.

In December 2019, France fined Google €150 million for advertiser suspensions on Google Ads, arguing it had "abused its dominant position by adopting opaque and difficult to understand rules" which it was then free to "interpret and modify" at its own discretion.

Controversies

Trademarked keywords
Google has come under fire for allowing AdWords advertisers to bid on trademarked keywords. In 2004, Google started allowing advertisers to bid on a wide variety of search terms in the US and Canada, including trademarks of their competitors and in May 2008 expanded this policy to the UK and Ireland. Advertisers are restricted from using other companies' trademarks in their advertisement text if the trademark has been registered with Advertising Legal Support team.

In March 2010, Google was involved with a trademark infringement case involving three French companies that own Louis Vuitton trademarks. The lawsuit concerned if Google was responsible for advertisers purchasing keywords that violate trademark infringement. Ultimately, the Court of Justice of the European Union ruled that Google AdWords were “not a breach of EU trademark law, but that the content of some advertisements that are linked by Google keywords may well be in breach depending upon the particular facts of the case.”  Additionally, in some American jurisdictions, the use of a person's name as a keyword for advertising or trade purposes without the person's consent has raised Right to Privacy concerns.

In 2013, the Tenth Circuit Court of Appeals held in 1-800 Contacts, Inc. v. Lens.com, Inc. that online contact lens seller Lens.com did not commit trademark infringement when it purchased AdWords and other search advertisements using competitor 1-800 Contacts' federally registered 1800 CONTACTS trademark as a keyword. In August 2016, the Federal Trade Commission filed an administrative complaint against 1-800 Contacts alleging that its search advertising trademark enforcement practices have unreasonably restrained competition in violation of the FTC Act. 1-800 Contacts has denied all wrongdoing and is scheduled to appear before an FTC administrative law judge in April 2017.

IT support ban 
In 2018, Google implemented a policy change which restricts the advertising of consumer technical support, including, "troubleshooting, security, virus removal, internet connectivity, online accounts (for example, password resets or login support), or software installation", Google's Director of Global Product Policy, David Graff stated that the policy was intended to "address abuse" and "fraudulent activity" from third-party technical support providers, and that a verification program for legitimate providers would be rolled out "in the coming months". This is yet to manifest, resulting in an effective ban on all IT support and repair related services on the Google Ads platform. Commentators have expressed concerns that this is an attempt by Google to stifle consumers' right to repair electronic devices.

Use by fossil fuel companies for greenwashing 
Fossil fuel companies, funders and public relations agencies including ExxonMobil, Shell, Aramco, McKinsey, and Goldman Sachs are among the largest customers of Google Ads. One in five Google Ads for climate-related terms (e.g. net zero, carbon storage, carbon capture and energy transition) were paid by fossil fuel companies. A study by The Guardian and InfluenceMap found that Shell's ads appeared on 86% of searches for "net zero". Over half of users in a 2020 survey could not tell the difference between a normal Google result and a Google Ad. One of the study's authors, InfluenceMap stated "Google is letting groups with a vested interest in the continued use of fossil fuels pay to influence the resources people receive when they are trying to educate themselves. The oil and gas sector has moved away from contesting the science of climate change and now instead seeks to influence public discussions about decarbonization in its favor."

Anti-abortion clinics 
A report conducted by the Tech Transparency Project found that women from low-income parts of the cities in the US are more likely to be targeted with anti-abortion crisis pregnancy centers than women in wealthier parts of the city. Many of these crisis centers have projected themselves as abortion clinics while advocating the anti-abortion measures for pregnant women.

The research was conducted in Atlanta, Miami, and Phoenix with women from three different income rates and using the phrases "abortion clinic near me" and "I want an abortion". According to the results. Phoenix showed a 16% increase in crisis center recommendations from low to middle income, while there was a 49% difference when compared to high-income accounts.

See also

 AdSense
 List of Google products
 Click fraud
 Search engine marketing
 Central ad server
 Performance-based advertising
 Pay-per-click 
 Digital marketing

References

External links

Ads
Pay-per-click search engines
Online advertising services and affiliate networks
Online advertising methods
Marketing companies established in 2000
2000 establishments in the United States